Burke Fahling (born August 3, 1997) is an American professional soccer player who plays as a midfielder for Pittsburgh Riverhounds.

Career

Youth
Fahling spent time in the academy setup of USSDA sides Crossfire Premier and Seattle Sounders FC.

College and amateur
In 2016, Fahling went to play college soccer at the University of Memphis. Over two seasons with the Tigers, Fahling made 33 appearances, scoring 2 goals and tallying 7 assists, also been a two time AAC Weekly Honor Roll recipient. In 2018, Fahling returned to Washington, transferring to Seattle University, where he managed one season in three years, missing 2018 due to injury and the 2020 season due to the COVID-19 pandemic. Fahling made 20 appearances for the Redhawks, scoring a single goal and tallying 5 assists.

In 2018, Fahling also appeared for NPSL side OSA Seattle, making 2 appearances.

Professional
On February 26, 2021, Fahling signed with USL Championship side Charleston Battery following a successful trial. He made his professional debut on May 7, 2021, appearing as a 60th-minute substitute during a 1–1 draw with New York Red Bulls II.

On March 31, 2022, Fahling joined USL League One club FC Tucson on loan. 

Following the 2022 season, Fahling was released by Charleston. He subsequently joined USL Championship side Pittsburgh Riverhounds for their 2023 season.

References

External links
Memphis bio
Seattle bio
Charleston Battery bio

1997 births
American soccer players
Association football midfielders
Charleston Battery players
FC Tucson players
Living people
Memphis Tigers men's soccer players
National Premier Soccer League players
People from Kenmore, Washington
People from Tupelo, Mississippi
Pittsburgh Riverhounds SC players
Seattle Redhawks men's soccer players
Soccer players from Mississippi
Soccer players from Washington (state)
USL Championship players